Vasanthawada is a village in Atreyapuram Mandal, Dr. B.R. Ambedkar Konaseema district in the state of Andhra Pradesh in India.

Geography 

Demographics 
 India census, Vasanthawada had a population of 2044, out of which 1043 were male and 1001 were female. The population of children below 6 years of age was 8%. The literacy rate of the village was 70%.

References 

Villages in Atreyapuram mandal